Wing Public School District 28 is a school district headquartered in Wing, North Dakota.

It is within Burleigh County.

A playground was built in 1965. In 2014 it was replaced with new equipment.

By 2020 the district began using a school week of four days instead of five. The district administration decided on this due to the low number of breaks in the spring season and the harsh winters.

References

External links
 Wing School District
School districts in North Dakota
Education in Burleigh County, North Dakota